The name Meerwala refers to both a mouza and a  village in Jatoi, a rural tehsil in the Muzaffargarh District of Punjab, Pakistan. Meerwala achieved global infamy in 2002 as the village whose tribal elders ordered the gang rape of Mukhtar Mai.

References

Populated places in Muzaffargarh District